Chapman Whitney Streetwalkers was the first post-Family album by Roger Chapman and Charlie Whitney, following the late 1973 dissolution of that band. The musicians used here included other former member of Family, and the band soon evolved into the Streetwalkers.

Track listing
All tracks composed by Roger Chapman and Charlie Whitney

Personnel
Roger Chapman — vocals, percussion
John Wetton, Rick Grech — bass
Godfrey MacLean — congas
Ian Wallace, Michael Giles —  drums
Charlie Whitney, Neil Hubbard — guitar
Max Middleton, Tim Hinkley — keyboards
Jim Cregan, John Wetton, Linda Lewis, Tim Hinkley — backing vocals
 Mel Collins —  bass clarinet, clarinet, saxophone
Del Newman - string arrangements
Technical
George Chkiantz - engineer
John Kosh - cover design
Tony Evans - photography

References

External links

1974 debut albums
Streetwalkers albums
Reprise Records albums